Tyholt is a neighbourhood in the city of Trondheim in Trøndelag county, Norway.  It is located in the borough of Lerkendal at the highest point in the city of Trondheim. Before 1964, Tyholt was part of the old municipality of Strinda. It borders the neighborhoods Singsaker to the west, Strindheim to the north, Moholt to the south and Valentinlyst to the east. Most of Tyholt is residential. The area has a good view of Trondheim's city centre and the neighborhoods of Lade and Strinda.

The Centre for Marine Technology of the Norwegian University of Science and Technology and Centres of Excellence Centre for Ships and Ocean Structures (CeSOS) and AMOS (Centre for Autonomous Marine Operations and Systems) are hosted at facilities close to the tower. Still in close proximity is MARINTEK, hosting the only major test tank for maritime technology in Scandinavia. Located in Tyholt are the Trondheim offices of Telenor and the Norwegian Broadcasting Corporation. The latter hosts the radio channels NRK P1 and NRK P3.

References

Geography of Trondheim
Neighbourhoods of Trondheim